Kung Fu Mama – Agentin mit Kids is a 2011 German action television film directed by Simon X. Rost. The film stars Claudia Hiersche as Nina Wenzel, as a Secret Service Agent,  as her neighbor and a cool biker.

Plot
She was the most powerful weapon in the German Secret Service armory. Nina Wenzel's (Claudia Hiersche) greatest success was arresting the international arms smuggler Wolf Geiger. But when her sister dies, the top agent's life changes totally: she quits, takes in her sister's three kids and looks after them lovingly. Now, five years on, Geiger is due to stand trial, but the unscrupulous gun runner makes a spectacular escape. Nina's former boss Heinrich Husen (Alexander Radszun) sees only one hope, his best undercover agent must return to active service. After initially hesitating, Nina agrees, but juggling raising kids and the secret service takes all she has got. She cannot blow her cover whatever happens, which makes the budding romance between Nina and her neighbor Ruby, a cool biker, extremely complicated.

Cast
 Claudia Hiersche as Nina Wenzel
  as Ruby
 Alexander Radszun as Heinrich Husen
  as Wolf Geiger

References

External links 
 

2011 television films
German action comedy films
German television films
2010s German-language films
German-language television shows
2011 action comedy films
Girls with guns films
2011 films
2010s German films
RTL (German TV channel) original programming